Independência (Portuguese meaning independence) may refer to:

Places in Brazil
Independência, Ceará, a municipality in the state of Ceará
Independência, Rio Grande do Sul, a municipality in the state of Rio Grande do Sul
Independência, Porto Alegre, a neighborhood in the city of Porto Alegre in the state of Rio Grande do Sul

Other uses
Independência Futebol Clube, a Brazilian football club
Independência (album), a 1987 album by Brazilian rock band Capital Inicial

See also
Independence (disambiguation)
Independencia (disambiguation), the Spanish word for independence